Tracy Chou (born 1987) is American software engineer and feminist.

Tracy Chou may also refer to:

 (born 1983) is Taiwanese actress.